The 2016 Big Ten Conference football season was the 121st season of college football play for the Big Ten Conference and is a part of the 2016 NCAA Division I FBS football season. This was the Big Ten's third season with 14 teams. The season marked a return to a nine-game conference schedule, something the league has not had since 1984.

Penn State and Ohio State each finished with identical 8–1 conference records, but Penn State won the head-to-head tiebreaker over the Buckeyes. Accordingly, Penn State won the East Division for the first time since the conference instituted divisions. Wisconsin won the West Division for the fourth time in the six years the division had existed.

In the Big Ten Championship held on December 3, 2016 at Lucas Oil Stadium in Indianapolis, Indiana, Penn State defeated Wisconsin 38–31 to win the Big Ten.

Coaches

Coaching changes
Several Big Ten teams changed head coaches in 2016. Tracy Claeys at Minnesota had the "interim" tag removed from his title and served as the permanent head coach.  D. J. Durkin was the new head coach at Maryland taking over for Randy Edsall after having spent the previous year as the defensive coordinator at Michigan, while Rutgers replaced Kyle Flood with Chris Ash, who comes to Piscataway after serving as a co-defensive coordinator at Ohio State. In March, new Illinois athletic director Josh Whitman announced he was replacing Bill Cubit as head football coach with Lovie Smith.

On October 16, 2016, Purdue announced they were parting ways with head coach Darrell Hazell. Receivers coach Gerad Parker was named interim head coach for the remainder of the 2016 season. On December 5, Purdue named Western Kentucky football coach Jeff Brohm their next head coach.

On December 1, 2016, Indiana University announced that head coach Kevin Wilson resigned his position. Indiana associate head coach Tom Allen was named Wilson's permanent successor. On January 3, 2017, the University of Minnesota announced they were relieving head coach Tracy Claeys of his duties.  Three days later, Minnesota announced the hiring of Western Michigan coach P. J. Fleck to take over as head coach.

Head coaches
Note: All records are through the completion of the 2016 season

* Darrell Hazell was fired on Oct. 16, 2016 and Gerad Parker was named interim coach to finish the season. 

** Kevin Wilson resigned as head coach at Indiana on Dec. 1, 2016 and Tom Allen was named his full-time replacement and will coach in Indiana's bowl game.

Regular season

Rankings

Schedule
Source

All times Eastern time.† denotes Homecoming game

Week 1

Week 2

Week 3

Week 4

Week 5

Week 6

Week 7

Week 8

Week 9

Week 10

Week 11

Week 12

Week 13

Players of the Week

Records against FBS conferences
2016 records against FBS conferences

Power-Five conferences & independents

Group of Five Conferences

Regular season attendance

Bold – Exceed capacity
†Season High

Big Ten Championship Game

Bowl games
Big Ten went 3–7 in the 2016–17 Bowl Season

Rankings are from AP Poll.  All times Eastern Time Zone.

Awards and honors

Players of the Year
2016 Big Ten Player of the Year Awards

All-conference players

2016 Big Ten All-Conference Honors

Unanimous selections in ALL CAPS

Coaches Honorable Mention: ILLINOIS: Hardy Nickerson, Carroll Phillips; INDIANA: Marcelino Ball, Ralph Green III, Richard Lagow, Marcus Oliver, Mitchell Paige, Devine Redding, Nick Westbrook; IOWA: Ike Boettger, LeShun Daniels Jr., Parker Hesse, George Kittle, Greg Mabin, Riley McCarron; MARYLAND: Michael Dunn; MICHIGAN: Kenny Allen (kicker), Ben Bredeson, Matt Godin, Mike McCray, De'Veon Smith, Dymonte Thomas; MICHIGAN STATE: Darian Hicks, Montae Nicholson, L.J. Scott; MINNESOTA: Shannon Brooks, Jonathan Celestin, Scott Epke, Jalen Myrick, Drew Wolitarsky; NEBRASKA: Tommy Armstrong Jr., Josh Banderas, Cethan Carter, Ross Dzuris, Nick Gates, Chris Jones, Kevin Maurice, De'Mornay Pierson-El (return specialist); NORTHWESTERN: Tommy Doles, Clayton Thorson; OHIO STATE: Jerome Baker, Marcus Baugh, Noah Brown, Michael Hill, Jayln Holmes, Sam Hubbard, Damon Webb; PENN STATE: Brandon Bell, Brian Gaia, Mike Gesicki, Blake Gillikin, Chris Godwin, Parker Cothren, John Reid; PURDUE: Markus Bailey, David Blough, Jason King, Evan Panfil, Jordan Roos, Joe Schopper; RUTGERS: Tariq Cole; WISCONSIN: Jack Cichy, Michael Dieter, D'Cota Dixon, T. J. Edwards, Alec James, Leo Musso, Chikwe Obasih, Jazz Peavy, Derrick Tindal.

Media Honorable Mention: ILLINOIS: Hardy Nickerson, Joe Spencer, Malik Turner, Tre Watson; INDIANA: Marcelino Ball, Jonathan Crawford, Ricky Jones, Marcus Oliver, Mitchell Paige, Devine Redding, Nick Westbrook; IOWA: Nathan Bazata, C.J. Beathard, Ike Boettger, Cole Croston, LeShun Daniels Jr., Parker Hesse, George Kittle, Riley McCarron, Akrum Wadley; MARYLAND: Jermaine Carter, Shane Cockerille, Michael Dunn; MICHIGAN: Kenny Allen, Ben Bredeson, Jehu Chesson, Delano Hill, Mike McCray, De'Veon Smith, Dymonte Thomas; MICHIGAN STATE: Chris Frey, Darian Hicks, Montae Nicholson, Josiah Price, R.J. Shelton; MINNESOTA: Jonathan Celestin, Scott Epke, Jack Lynn, Jalen Myrick, Damarius Travis; NEBRASKA: Tommy Armstrong Jr., Josh Banderas, Drew Brown, Cethan Carter, Ross Dzuris, Chris Jones, Kevin Maurice, Terrell Newby, De'Mornay Pierson-El (return specialist), Jordan Westerkamp; NORTHWESTERN: Garrett Dickerson, Tommy Doles, Montre Hartage, Clayton Thorson; OHIO STATE: Jerome Baker, Marcus Baugh, Noah Brown, Parris Campbell (return specialist), Michael Hill, Jalyn Holmes, Sam Hubbard, Denzel Ward, Chris Worley; PENN STATE: Marcus Allen, Brandon Bell, Jason Cabinda, Brian Gaia, Blake Gillikin, John Reid; PURDUE: Markus Bailey, Jason King, Evan Panfil, Jake Replogle, Jordan Roos, Joe Schopper; RUTGERS: Blessuan Austin; WISCONSIN: Jack Cichy, Michael Dieter, T.J. Edwards, Chikwe Obasih, Jazz Peavy, Conor Sheehy, Derrick Tindal.

All-Americans

The 2016 College Football All-America Team is composed of the following College Football All-American first teams chosen by the following selector organizations: Associated Press (AP), Football Writers Association of America (FWAA), American Football Coaches Association (AFCA), Walter Camp Foundation (WCFF), The Sporting News (TSN), Sports Illustrated (SI), USA Today (USAT) ESPN, CBS Sports (CBS), FOX Sports (FOX) College Football News (CFN), Scout.com, Phil Steele (PS), Athlon Sports, Pro Football Focus (PFF) and Yahoo! Sports (Yahoo!).

Currently, the NCAA compiles consensus all-America teams in the sports of Division I-FBS football and Division I men's basketball using a point system computed from All-America teams named by coaches associations or media sources.  The system consists of three points for a first-team honor, two points for second-team honor, and one point for third-team honor.  Honorable mention and fourth team or lower recognitions are not accorded any points.  Football consensus teams are compiled by position and the player accumulating the most points at each position is named first team consensus all-American.  Currently, the NCAA recognizes All-Americans selected by the AP, AFCA, FWAA, TSN, and the WCFF to determine Consensus and Unanimous All-Americans. Any player named to the First Team by all five of the NCAA-recognized selectors is deemed a Unanimous All-American.

*Sporting News All-America Team (TSN)
*Sports Illustrated All-America Team (SI)
*USA Today All-America Team (USAT)
*ESPN All-America Team
*AP All-America Team
*FWAA All-America Team
*Walter Camp All-America Team (WCFF)
*FOX Sports All-America Team
*CBS Sports All-America Team
*Phil Steele All-America Team
*AFCA All-America Team
*Athlon Sports All-America Team
*Pro Football Focus All-America Team

Academic All-Americans

2016 CoSIDA Academic-All Americans

National award winners

John Mackey Award (Best Tight End)
Jake Butt, Michigan

Rimington Award (Best Center)
Pat Elflein, Ohio State

Lott IMPACT Trophy (Defensive Best in Character & Performance)
Jabrill Peppers, Michigan

2016 NCAA List of National Award Winners

NFL Draft

Trades
In the explanations below, (PD) indicates trades completed prior to the start of the draft (i.e. Pre-Draft), while (D) denotes trades that took place during the 2017 draft. Please note that this is the first year where teams will be allowed to trade compensatory picks.

Round one

Round two

Round three

Round four

Round five

Round six

Round seven

Sources

References